Cícero Herbete de Oliveira Melo, commonly known as Beto (born September 3, 1980 in Itaporanga), is a Brazilian association football striker. He is currently retired from football.

Beto has previously played for Fluminense in the Campeonato Brasileiro.

References

1980 births
Living people
Brazilian footballers
Association football forwards
Campinense Clube players
Fluminense FC players
Esporte Clube Vitória players
Treze Futebol Clube players
Clube Náutico Capibaribe players
Associação Desportiva São Caetano players
Clube Atlético Mineiro players
Criciúma Esporte Clube players
Esporte Clube Bahia players
Ipatinga Futebol Clube players
Salgueiro Atlético Clube players